Lorcan John Tucker (born 10 September 1996) is an Irish cricketer and wicket-keeper batter.

He was part of Ireland's squad for the 2016 Under-19 Cricket World Cup and made his international debut for the Ireland cricket team in September 2016.

He currently plays for MI Emirates in the ILT20.

In January 2020, he was one of nineteen players to be awarded a central contract from Cricket Ireland, the first year in which all contracts were awarded on a full-time basis. In 2022 he was awarded a further two-year contract.

Domestic and T20 career
Tucker made his List A debut for Leinster Lightning in the 2017 Inter-Provincial Cup on 4 June 2017. He made his first-class debut for Leinster Lightning in the 2017 Inter-Provincial Championship on 5 June 2017. In April 2019, he was one of five cricketers to be awarded with an Emerging Player Contract by Cricket Ireland, ahead of the 2019 domestic season.

In July 2019, Tucker was selected to play for the Dublin Chiefs in the inaugural edition of the Euro T20 Slam cricket tournament. However, the following month, the tournament was cancelled.

In December 2022 he was signed by MI Emirates to play in the inaugural season on the International League T20 franchise league based in the UAE. He made his debut on 29 January against Desert Vipers. Tucker made 85 runs from 4 innings in the tournament at a strike rate of 120. He was controversially retired out in a game against Abu Dhabi Knight Riders while on 33(23).

International career

Early career 
Tucker made his Twenty20 International (T20I) debut against Hong Kong on 5 September 2016. In January 2017, he was called up as a replacement for the injured Stuart Thompson for Ireland's squad in the 2017 Desert T20 Challenge.

In January 2019, Tucker was named in Ireland's T20I squad for the Oman Quadrangular Series. At the same time, he was also named in Ireland's Test, One Day International (ODI) and T20I squads for their series against Afghanistan in India, but he did not play during the tour.

In April 2019, he was named in Ireland's ODI squads for the one-off match against England and the 2019 Ireland Tri-Nation Series. He made his ODI debut for Ireland against England on 3 May 2019.

In June 2019, Tucker was named in the Ireland Wolves squad for their home series against the Scotland A cricket team.

In July 2019, he made his first international fifty for Ireland in the 2nd ODI of Zimbabwe's tour of Ireland. Tucker made 56(51) to help Ireland to win by 5 runs. Later that month he was named in Ireland's Test squad for their one-off match against England at Lord's, but he did not play.

In September 2019, Tucker was named in Ireland's squad for the 2019 ICC T20 World Cup Qualifier tournament in the United Arab Emirates. He played one match in the tournament but did not bat.

On 10 July 2020, Tucker was named in Ireland's 21-man squad to travel to England to start training behind closed doors for the ODI series against the England cricket team. Tucker did not play in the series as after a poor run of form he had been replaced by Neil Rock as first-choice wicketkeeper.

In February 2021, Tucker was named in the Ireland Wolves' squad for their tour to Bangladesh. He high scored with 82* in the third unofficial ODI.

In September 2021, Tucker was named in Ireland's provisional squad for the 2021 ICC Men's T20 World Cup. He did not play in the tournament.

Breakthrough Year 
Tucker made a long-awaited breakthrough in late 2021 as he made 141 runs across two T20Is against the USA in Florida. This included a match winning 84(56) in the second T20I. He had been moved up the order to the number 3 role and his form in T20Is improved.

He would follow this up with scores of 78(38) against South Africa and 50(32) against Afghanistan ahead of the 2022 ICC Men's T20 World Cup.

In September 2022 he was named in Ireland's squad for the T20 World Cup. He would have a highly successful tournament of finish as team's top scorer with 204 runs across 7 games. His 45*(35) against West Indies helped Ireland make it through to the Super 12s round. He then made 34(37) as Ireland famously beat England at the MCG before smashing 71*(48) in defeat to Australia.

In February 2023, Tucker was named in Ireland's Test squad for their tours of Bangladesh in March 2023 and Sri Lanka in April 2023. He was also named in the T20I and ODI squads for the tours.

References

External links
 

1996 births
Living people
Irish cricketers
Ireland One Day International cricketers
Ireland Twenty20 International cricketers
Leinster Lightning cricketers
Cricketers from Dublin (city)